Mondair was a charter airline based in Agadir, Morocco. It was wholly owned by Moroccan private investors. The company was founded in 2002 and disestablished in 2004.

Code data 
ICAO Code: MMA
Callsign: Mondair

Services 

Mondair operated passenger charters from Agadir to Paris, as well as serving leisure destinations in Morocco, including Marrakech and Oujda.

Fleet
 2 Boeing 737-300

References 

Defunct airlines of Morocco
Airlines established in 2002
Airlines disestablished in 2004
2002 establishments in Morocco
2004 disestablishments in Morocco
Agadir